Molly Horst Raphael is an American librarian. From 2011 to 2012, she was president of the American Library Association. In 2009, she won the Arthur Flemming Civil Rights award. She served in urban public libraries for 40 years. Raphael’s 33 years at the District of Columbia Public Library (DCPL) began as a youth librarian and culminated in her appointment as Library Director in 1997. In 2003, Raphael was recruited to lead the award-winning Multnomah County Library (MCL) in Portland, Oregon. She retired from Moltnomah County Public Library i May 2009.

Life
She graduated from Oberlin College, and Simmons College.
She was director of the District of Columbia Public Library.
She is on the advisory board of Credo Reference.

References

External links

 
 

American librarians
American women librarians
Presidents of the American Library Association
Living people
Year of birth missing (living people)
21st-century American women